Jianlong may refer to:

Jianlong (960–963), reign period of Emperor Taizu of Song
Jianlong, Chongqing, town in Bishan District, Chongqing, China
Jianlong Steel, Chinese steel company